Philo; –50 CE) also called Philo of Alexandaria, and Philo Judaeus, was a Hellenistic Jewish philosopher who lived in Alexandria, in the Roman province of Egypt.

Philo's deployment of allegory to harmonize Jewish scripture, mainly the Torah, with Greek philosophy was the first documented of its kind, and thereby often misunderstood. Many critics of Philo assumed his allegorical perspective would lend credibility to the notion of legend over historicity. Philo often advocated a literal understanding of the Torah and the historicity of such described events, while at other times favoring allegorical readings.

Though never properly attributed, Philo's marriage of Jewish exegesis and Stoic philosophy provided a formula later picked up by other Midrash content from the 3rd and 4th centuries. Some claimed this lack of credit or affinity for Philo by the Rabbinic leadership at the time, was due to his adoption of allegorical instead of literal interpretations of the Hebrew Bible, though it was likely due to his criticism of Rabbinic scholars, citing their works and ideas were "full of Sybaritic profligacy and licentiousness to their everlasting shame", "eager to give a specious appearance to infamous actions, so as to secure notoriety for disgraceful deeds", and ultimately, that he "disregards the envious disposition of such men, and shall proceed to narrate the true events of Moses' life" of which Philo felt were unjustly hidden and covered over.

According to Josephus, Philo was largely inspired by Aristobulus of Alexandria and the Alexandrian school. The only event in Philo's life that can be decisively dated is his participation in the embassy to Rome in 40 CE; whereby he represented the Alexandrian Jews in a delegation to the Roman Emperor Caligula following civil strife between the Alexandrian Jewish and Greek communities.

Life
Philo's dates of birth and death are unknown but can be judged by Philo's description of himself as "old" when he was part of the delegation to Gaius Caligula in 38 CE. Jewish history professor Daniel R. Schwartz estimates his birth year as sometime between 20 and 10 BCE. Philo's reference to an event under the reign of Emperor Claudius indicates that he died sometime after 41 CE.

Although the names of his parents are unknown, it is known that Philo came from a family which was noble, honourable and wealthy. It was either his father or paternal grandfather who was granted Roman citizenship from Roman dictator Gaius Julius Caesar. Jerome wrote that Philo came de genere sacerdotum (from a priestly family). His ancestors and family had social ties and connections to the priesthood in Judea, the Hasmonean dynasty, the Herodian dynasty and the Julio-Claudian dynasty in Rome.

Philo had two brothers, Alexander the Alabarch and Lysimachus. Through Alexander, Philo had two nephews, Tiberius Julius Alexander and Marcus Julius Alexander. The latter was the first husband of the Herodian princess Berenice. Marcus died in 43 or 44.

Philo visited the Second Temple in Jerusalem at least once in his lifetime. Philo along with his brothers received a thorough education. They were educated in the Hellenistic culture of Alexandria and the culture of ancient Rome, to a degree in Ancient Egyptian culture and particularly in the traditions of Judaism, in the study of Jewish traditional literature and in Greek philosophy.

Embassy to Gaius 

In  (Embassy to Gaius), Philo describes his diplomatic mission to Gaius Caligula, one of the few events in his life which is known specifically. He relates that he was carrying a petition describing the sufferings of the Alexandrian Jews and asking the emperor to secure their rights. Philo gives a description of their sufferings, more detailed than Josephus's, to characterize the Alexandrian Greeks as the aggressors in the civil strife that had left many Jews and Greeks dead.

Philo lived in an era of increasing ethnic tension in Alexandria, exacerbated by the new strictures of imperial rule. Some expatriate Hellenes (Greeks) in Alexandria condemned the Jews for a supposed alliance with Rome, even as Rome was seeking to suppress Jewish nationalism in the Roman province of Judea. In Ad Flaccum, Philo describes the situation of the Jews in Egypt, writing that they numbered not less than a million and inhabited two of the five districts in Alexandria. He recounts the abuses of the prefect Aulus Avilius Flaccus, who he says retaliated against the Jews when they refused to worship Caligula as a god. Daniel Schwartz surmises that given this tense background it may have been politically convenient for Philo to favor abstract monotheism instead of overt pro-Judeanism.

Philo considers Caligula's plan to erect a statue of himself in the Second Temple to be a provocation, asking, "Are you making war upon us, because you anticipate that we will not endure such indignity, but that we will fight on behalf of our laws, and die in defence of our national customs? For you cannot possibly have been ignorant of what was likely to result from your attempt to introduce these innovations respecting our temple." In his entire presentation, he implicitly supports the Jewish commitment to rebel against the emperor rather than allow such sacrilege to take place.

Philo says he was regarded by his people as having unusual prudence, due to his age, education, and knowledge. This indicates that he was already an older man at this time (40 CE).

In Antiquities of the Jews, Josephus tells of Philo's selection by the Alexandrian Jewish community as their principal representative before the Roman emperor Gaius Caligula. He says that Philo agreed to represent the Alexandrian Jews in regard to civil disorder that had developed between the Jews and the Greeks. Josephus also tells us that Philo was skilled in philosophy, and that he was brother to the alabarch Alexander. According to Josephus, Philo and the larger Jewish community refused to treat the emperor as a god, to erect statues in honour of the emperor, and to build altars and temples to the emperor. Josephus says Philo believed that God actively supported this refusal.

Josephus' complete comments about Philo:

This event is also described in Book 2, Chapter 5 of Eusebius's Historia Ecclesiae

Works

Some of Philo's works have been preserved in Greek, while others have survived through Armenian translations, and a smaller number survive in a Latin translation. Exact date of writing and original plan of organization is not known for much of the text attributed to Philo.

Most of Philo's surviving work deals with the Torah (the first five books of the Bible). Within this corpus are three categories:
 Quaestiones ("Inquiries") – short verse-by-verse exposition: four books on the Book of Genesis and two on the Book of Exodus. All six books are preserved through an Armenian translation published by Jean-Baptiste Aucher in 1826. Comparison with surviving Greek and Latin fragments recommends the translation as literal and accurate so far as it goes, but suggests that some of the original content is missing. There are thought to be twelve original books, six on Genesis and six on Exodus.
 Allegorical Commentary – longer exegesis explaining esoteric meanings; the surviving text deals only with the Book of Genesis, with the notable omission of Genesis 1.
 "Exposition of the Law" – more straightforward synthesis of topics in the Pentateuch, probably written for gentiles as well as Jews.

Philo is also credited with writing:
 Apologies for Judaism including On the Life of Moses, On the Jews, and On the Contemplative Life.
 Historical works (describing current events in Alexandria and the Roman Empire), including Ad Flaccum and De legatione ad Gaium
 Philosophical works including Every Good Man Is Free, On the Eternity of the World, On Animals, and On Providence, the latter two surviving only through Armenian translation.
 Works now lost, but mentioned by Eusebius of Caesarea.

Philosophy
Philo represents the apex of Jewish-Hellenistic syncretism. His work attempts to combine Plato and Moses into one philosophical system. His ethics were strongly influenced by Pythagoreanism and Stoicism, preferring a morality of virtues without passions, such as lust/desire and anger, but with a "common human sympathy".

View of scripture 
Philo bases his doctrines on the Hebrew Bible, which he considers as the source and standard not only of religious truth but of all truth. Although he distinguishes between the words uttered by God himself, such as the Ten Commandments, and the edicts of Moses, as the special laws.

Philo regards the Bible as the source not only of religious revelation, but also of philosophic truth; for he claimed that Greek philosophers' ideas had already been laid out in the Bible: Heraclitus' idea of binary oppositions, according to Who is the Heir of Divine Things? § 43 [i. 503]; and the conception of the wise man expounded by Zeno, the founder of Stoicism, according to Every Good Man is Free, § 8 [ii. 454].

Philo's allegorical interpretation of scripture allows him to grapple with morally disturbing events and impose a cohesive explanation of stories. Specifically, Philo interprets the characters of the Bible as aspects of the human being, and the stories of the Bible as episodes from universal human experience. For example, Adam represents the mind and Eve the senses. Noah represents tranquility, a stage of "relative" (incomplete but progressing) righteousness.

View of God 

Philo affirms a transcendent God without physical features or emotional qualities resembling those of human beings. In Philo, God exists beyond time and space and does not make special interventions into the world because he already encompasses the entire cosmos.

Philo's notion is even more abstract than that of the monad of Pythagoras or the Good of Plato. Only God's existence is certain, no appropriate predicates can be conceived. Following Plato, Philo equates matter to nothingness and sees its effect in fallacy, discord, damage, and decay of things. This view enables Philo to combine the Jewish belief in creation with the Greek conviction about the formation of all things from the permanent matter.

View of man 
Philo seems to look at man as trichotomous, nous (mind), psyche (soul), soma (body), common to the Hellenistic view of mind-soul-body. In Philo's writings, however, mind and spirit are used interchangeably.

Logos 
Philo wrote that God created and governed the world through mediators. Logos is the chief among them, the next to God, demiurge of the world. Logos is immaterial, an adequate image of God, his shadow, his firstborn son. Being the mind of the Eternal, Logos is imperishable. He is neither uncreated as God is, nor created as men are, but occupies a middle position. He has no autonomous power, only an entrusted one.

Philo probably was the first philosopher who identified Plato's Ideas with Creator's thoughts. These thoughts make the contents of Logos; they were the seals for making sensual things during world creation. Logos resembles a book with creature paradigms. An Architect's design before the construction of a city serves to Philo as another simile of Logos. Since creation, Logos binds things together. As the receptacle and holder of ideas, Logos is distinct from the material world. At the same time, Logos pervades the world, supporting it.

Logos has the function of an advocate on behalf of humanity and also that of a God's envoy to the world. He puts human minds in order. The right reason is an infallible law, the source of any other laws. The angel closing Balaam's way (Numbers XXII, 31) is interpreted by Philo as manifestation of Logos, which acts as man's conscience.

Numbers 
Philo frequently engages in Pythagorean-inspired numerology, explaining at length the importance of religious numbers such as six, seven, and ten.

Politics 
Commentators can infer from his mission to Caligula that Philo was involved in politics. However, the nature of his political beliefs, and especially his viewpoint on the Roman Empire, is a matter of debate.

Philo did suggest in his writings that a prudent man should withhold his true opinion about tyrants:

Knowledge of Greek and Hebrew
Philo was more fluent in Greek than in Hebrew and read the Jewish Scriptures chiefly from the Septuagint, a Koine Greek translation of Hebraic texts later compiled as the Hebrew Bible and the deuterocanonical books.

Philo identified the angel of the Lord (in the singular) with the Logos. Peter Schäfer argues that Philo's Logos was derived from his understanding of the "postbiblical Wisdom literature, in particular the Wisdom of Solomon". The Wisdom of Solomon is a Jewish work composed in Alexandria, Egypt, around the 1st century BCE, with the aim of bolstering the faith of the Jewish community in a hostile Greek world. It is one of the seven Sapiential or wisdom books included within the Septuagint.

The extent of Philo's knowledge of Hebrew is debated. His numerous etymologies of Hebrew names—which are along the lines of the etymologic midrash to Genesis and of the earlier rabbinism, although not modern Hebrew philology—suggest some familiarity. Philo offers for some names three or four etymologies, sometimes including the correct Hebrew root (e.g.,  as the origin of the name Jordan). However, his works do not display much understanding of Hebrew grammar, and they tend to follow the translation of the Septuagint more closely than the Hebrew version.

The name of God 
In the text attributed to Philo, he "consistently uses  as a designation for God". According to David B. Capes "the problem for this case, however, is that Christian scholars are responsible for copying and transmitting Philo's words to later generations" and add that "George Howard surveys evidence and concludes: 'Although it is improbable that Philo varied from the custom of writing the Tetragram when quoting from Scripture, it is likely that he used the word  when making a secondary reference to the divine name in his exposition'." James Royse concludes: "(1) the exegete [Philo] knows and reads biblical manuscripts in which the tetragram is written in palaeo-Hebrew or Aramaic script and not translated by kyrios and that (2) he quotes scriptures in the same way he would have pronounced it, that is, by translating it as kurios."

Influence and interpretations 
For a long time, Philo was read and explained mostly by Christian authors. Dei Rossi later gives a possible defense of Philo and writes that he can neither absolve nor convict him.

Texts and translations 
 
 Cohn, Leopold & Paul Wendland, Philonis Alexandrini Opera quæ supersunt (The Surviving Works of Philo of Alexandria) [Greek and Latin]. Berlin: George Reimer.
 Volumes 1–3 (1896, 1897, 1898)
 Voumes 4–6 (1902, 1906, 1915)
 Volume 7 (1926; indexed by Hans Leisegang)
  [Online Greek text of Volumes 1-7 above. Under "Graecum - Greco - Greek" section]

See also
 Allegorical interpretations of Plato
 Land of Onias
 Pseudo-Philo

Explanatory notes

Citations

General sources 
 
 Goodenough, Erwin R. (1938). The Politics of Philo Judaeus: Practice and Theory. With a "General Bibliography of Philo" by Howard L. Goodhart and Erwin R. Goodenough. Yale University Press.
 
 Kamesar, Adam, ed. (2009). The Cambridge Companion to Philo. Cambridge University Press, 2009. 
 Pearce, Sarah (2007) The Land of the Body: Studies in Philo's Representation of Egypt Tübingen, Mohr Siebeck. 
 Runia, David T. (1986). Philo of Alexandria and the Timaeus of Plato. Philosophia antiqua, 44. Brill, Leiden.
 
 
 Runia, D. T. (2001). On the Creation of the Cosmos according to Moses. Number 1 in Philo of Alexandria Commentary Series. Brill, Leiden.
 Sandmel, Samuel. (1979). Philo of Alexandria: An Introduction. Oxford University Press. .

External links

 
 

 Lecture on Philo Judaeus of Alexandria: Jews in the Greek World by Dr. Henry Abramson
 
 
 
 
 
 
 
 
 
 
 Open source XML versions of Philo's works have been made available by the Open Greek and Latin Project at the University of Leipzig. English translations of Philo's writings are also available here.
 
 

 
20s BC births
50s deaths
1st-century BCE Jews
1st-century BC Romans
1st-century Jews
1st-century Romans
Ancient Roman philosophers
Epistemologists
Hellenistic-era philosophers
Hellenistic Jewish writers
Jewish philosophers
Jews of Roman Alexandria
Metaphysicians
Ontologists
Philosophers of Judaism
Philosophers of mind
Philosophers of religion